The Waikūkūpa River is a river of the West Coast region of New Zealand's South Island. It flows northwest through Westland Tai Poutini National Park to reach the Tasman Sea 14 kilometres north of Fox Glacier township.

See also
List of rivers of New Zealand

References

Rivers of the West Coast, New Zealand
Westland District
Westland Tai Poutini National Park
Rivers of New Zealand